The General Conference on Weights and Measures (GCWM) is the supreme authority of the International Bureau of Weights and Measures (BIPM), the intergovernmental organization established in 1875 under the terms of the Metre Convention through which member states act together on matters related to measurement science and measurement standards. The CGPM is made up of delegates of the governments of the member states and observers from the Associates of the CGPM. Under its authority, the International Committee for Weights and Measures (ICWM) executes an exclusive direction and supervision of the BIPM.

Initially the Metre Convention was only concerned with the kilogram and the metre, but in 1921 the scope of the treaty was extended to accommodate all physical measurements and hence all aspects of the metric system. In 1960 the 11th CGPM approved the International System of Units, usually known as "SI".

The General Conference receives the report of the CIPM on work accomplished; it discusses and examines the arrangements required to ensure the propagation and improvement of the International System of Units (SI); it endorses the results of new fundamental metrological determinations and various scientific resolutions of international scope; and it decides all major issues concerning the organization and development of the BIPM, including its financial endowment.

The CGPM meets in Paris, usually once every four years. The 25th meeting of the CGPM took place from 18 to 20 November 2014, the 26th meeting of the CGPM took place in Versailles from 13 to 16 November 2018, and the 27th meeting of the CGPM took place from 15 to 18 November 2022.

Establishment
On 20 May 1875 an international treaty known as the Convention du Mètre (Metre Convention) was signed by 17 states. This treaty established an international organisation, the Bureau international des poids et mesures (BIPM), consisting of:
 Conférence générale des poids et mesures (CGPM), an intergovernmental conference of official delegates of member nations and the supreme authority for all actions;
 Comité international des poids et mesures (CIPM), consisting of selected scientists and metrologists, which prepares and executes the decisions of the CGPM and is responsible for the supervision of the International Bureau of Weights and Measures;
 a permanent laboratory and secretariat function, the activities of which include the establishment of the basic standards and scales of the principal physical quantities and maintenance of the international prototype standards.

The CGPM acts on behalf of the governments of its members.  In so doing, it appoints members to the CIPM, receives reports from the CIPM which it passes on to the governments and national laboratories on member states, examines and where appropriate approves proposals from the CIPM in respect of changes to the International System of Units (SI), approves the budget for the BIPM (over €13 million in 2018) and it decides all major issues concerning the organization and development of the BIPM.

The structure is analogous to that of a stock corporation. The BIPM is the organisation, the CGPM is the general meeting of the shareholders, the CIPM is the board of directors appointed by the CGPM, and the staff at the site in Saint-Cloud perform the day-to-day work.

Membership criteria
The CGPM recognises two classes of membership – full membership for those states that wish to participate in the activities of the BIPM and associate membership for those countries or economies that only wish to participate in the CIPM MRA program. Associate members have observer status at the CGPM. Since all formal liaison between the convention organisations and national governments is handled by the member state's ambassador to France, it is implicit that member states must have diplomatic relations with France, though during both world wars, nations that were at war with France retained their membership of the CGPM. CGPM meetings are chaired by the Président de l'Académie des Sciences de Paris.

Of the twenty countries that attended the Conference of the Metre in 1875, representatives of seventeen signed the convention on 20 May 1875.  In April 1884, H. J. Chaney, Warden of Standards in London unofficially contacted the BIPM inquiring whether the BIPM would calibrate some metre standards that had been manufactured in the United Kingdom. Broch, director of the BIPM replied that he was not authorised to perform any such calibrations for non-member states. On 17 September 1884, the British Government signed the convention on behalf of the United Kingdom. This number grew to 21 in 1900, 32 in 1950, and 49 in 2001. , there are 64 Member States and 36 Associate States and Economies of the General Conference (with year of partnership in parentheses):

Member states

Argentina (1877)
Australia (1947)
Austria (1875)
Belarus (2020)
Belgium (1875)
Brazil (1921)
Bulgaria (1911)
Canada (1907)
Chile (1908)
China (1977)
Colombia (2012)
Costa Rica (2022)
Croatia (2008)
Czech Republic (1922)
Denmark (1875)
Ecuador (2019)
Egypt (1962)
Estonia (2021)
Finland (1913)
France (1875)
Germany (1875)
Greece (2001)
Hungary (1925)
India (1880)
Indonesia (1960)
Iran (1975)
Iraq (2013)
Ireland (1925)
Israel (1985)
Italy (1875)
Japan (1885)
Kazakhstan (2008)
Kenya (2010)
Lithuania (2015)
Malaysia (2001)
Mexico (1890)
Montenegro (2018)
Morocco (2019)
Netherlands (1929)
New Zealand (1991)
Norway (1875)
Pakistan (1973)
Poland (1925)
Portugal (1876)
Romania (1884)
Russia (1875)
Saudi Arabia (2011)
Serbia (2001)
Singapore (1994)
Slovakia (1922)
Slovenia (2016)
South Africa (1964)
South Korea (1959)
Spain (1875)
Sweden (1875)
Switzerland (1875)
Thailand (1912)
Tunisia (2012)
Turkey (1875)
Ukraine (2018)
United Arab Emirates (2015)
United Kingdom (1884)
United States (1878)
Uruguay (1908)

Former members

Cameroon (1970–2012)
North Korea (1982–2012)
Venezuela (1879–1907, 1960–2018)

Notes

Associates
At the 21st meeting of the CGPM in October 1999, the category of "associate" was created for states not yet BIPM members and for economic unions.

Albania (2007)
Azerbaijan (2015)
Bangladesh (2010)
Bolivia (2008)
Bosnia and Herzegovina (2011)
Botswana (2012)
Cambodia (2021)
Caribbean Community (2005)
Chinese Taipei (2002)
Ethiopia (2018)
Georgia (2008)
Ghana (2009)
Hong Kong (2000)
Jamaica (2003)
Kuwait (2018)
Latvia (2001)
Luxembourg (2014)
Malta (2001)
Mauritius (2010)
Moldova (2007)
Mongolia (2013)
Namibia (2012)
North Macedonia (2006)
Oman (2012)
Panama (2003)
Paraguay (2009)
Peru (2009)
Philippines (2002)
Qatar (2016)
Sri Lanka (2007)
Syria (2012)
Tanzania (2018)
Uzbekistan (2018)
Vietnam (2003)
Zambia (2010)
Zimbabwe (2010–2020, 2022)

Former Associates

Cuba (2000–2021)
Seychelles (2010–2021)
Sudan (2014–2021)

CGPM meetings

International Committee for Weights and Measures

The International Committee for Weights and Measures consists of eighteen persons, each of a different nationality. elected by the General Conference on Weights and Measures (CGPM) whose principal task is to promote worldwide uniformity in units of measurement by taking direct action or by submitting proposals to the CGPM.

The CIPM meets every year (since 2011 in two sessions per year) at the Pavillon de Breteuil where, among other matters, it discusses reports presented to it by its Consultative Committees. Reports of the meetings of the CGPM, the CIPM, and all the Consultative Committees, are published by the BIPM.

Mission
The secretariat is based in Saint-Cloud, Hauts-de-Seine, France.

In 1999 the CIPM has established the CIPM Arrangement de reconnaissance mutuelle (Mutual Recognition Arrangement, MRA) which serves as the framework for the mutual acceptance of national measurement standards and for recognition of the validity of calibration and measurement certificates issued by national metrology institutes.

A recent focus area of the CIPM has been the revision of the SI.

Consultative committees
The CIPM has set up a number of consultative committees (CC) to assist it in its work. These committees are under the authority of the CIPM.  The president of each committee, who is expected to take the chair at CC meetings, is usually a member of the CIPM. Apart from the CCU, membership of a CC is open to National Metrology Institutes (NMIs) of Member States that are recognized internationally as most expert in the field. NMIs from Member States that are active in the field, but lack the expertise to become Members, are able to attend CC meetings as observers.

These committees are:
 CCAUV: Consultative Committee for Acoustics, Ultrasound and Vibration
 CCEM: Consultative Committee for Electricity and Magnetism
 CCL: Consultative Committee for Length
 CCM: Consultative Committee for Mass and Related Quantities
 CCPR: Consultative Committee for Photometry and Radiometry
 CCQM: Consultative Committee for Amount of Substance – Metrology in Chemistry and Biology
 CCRI: Consultative Committee for Ionizing Radiation
 CCT: Consultative Committee for Thermometry
 CCTF: Consultative Committee for Time and Frequency
 CCU: Consultative Committee for Units

The CCU's role is to advise on matters related to the development of the SI and the preparation of the SI brochure. It has liaison with other international bodies such as International Organization for Standardization (ISO), International Astronomical Union (IAU), International Union of Pure and Applied Chemistry (IUPAC), International Union of Pure and Applied Physics (IUPAP) and International Commission on Illumination (CIE).

Major reports
Official reports of the CIPM include:
 Reports of CIPM meetings (Procès-Verbaux) (CIPM Minutes)
 Annual Report to Governments on the financial and administrative situation of the BIPM
 Notification of the contributive parts of the Contracting States
 Convocation to meetings of the CGPM
 Report of the President of the CIPM to the CGPM

From time to time the CIPM has been charged by the CGPM to undertake major investigations related to activities affecting the CGPM or the BIPM.  Reports produced include:

The Blevin Report
The Blevin Report, published in 1998, examined the state of worldwide metrology. The report originated from a resolution passed at the 20th CGPM (October 1995) which committed the CIPM to 
The report identified, amongst other things, a need for closer cooperation between the BIPM and other organisations such as International Organization of Legal Metrology (OIML) and International Laboratory Accreditation Cooperation (ILAC) with clearly defined boundaries and interfaces between the organisations.  Another major finding was the need for cooperation between accreditation laboratories and the need to involve developing countries in the world of metrology.

The Kaarls Report
The Kaarls Report published in 2003 examined the role of the BIPM in the evolving needs for metrology in trade, industry and society.

SI Brochure
The CIPM has responsibility for commissioning the SI brochure, which is the formal definition of the International system of units. The brochure is produced by the CCU in conjunction with a number of other international organisations. Initially the brochure was only in French – the official language of the metre convention, but recent versions have been published simultaneously in both English and French, with the French text being the official text. The 6th edition was published in 1991, the 7th edition was published in 1998, and the 8th, in 2006. The most recent edition is the 9th edition, originally published as version 1 in 2019 to include the 2019 redefinition of the SI base units (aka "new SI"); it was updated to version 2 in December 2022 to also include the new SI prefixes ronna-, quetta-, ronto- and quecto- introduced in November 2022.

See also
 History of the metre
 Institute for Reference Materials and Measurements (IRMM)
 National Institute of Standards and Technology (NIST)
 National Conference on Weights and Measures (NCWM) United States
 Outline of the metric system
 Seconds pendulum

Notes

References

Conference generale des poids et mesures
Conference generale des poids et mesures
Metric system
Hauts-de-Seine
Organizations based in Paris
International organizations based in France